Allan Keith Staunton (19 September 1931 – 8 July 1963) was an Australian rugby league footballer who played in the 1950s.

Career
Allan Staunton was born at the Roma Private Hospital in Gosford, New South Wales. Staunton came to St. George via the Port Kembla club with Leo Hurley in 1952.

He played three seasons at St. George between 1952 and 1954, and played five-eighth in the 1953 Grand Final loss to South Sydney.

Staunton later moved to Wagga Wagga, New South Wales, and represented N.S.W. Country Firsts on two occasions in 1958 and 1959. He moved into administration at Wagga Leagues Club, and as Secretary-Manager in 1963, he was tragically killed in a car accident.

Accolades

A park in Wagga Wagga, New South Wales was named in his honour.

Staunton died on 8 July 1963, and was buried at Wagga Monumental Cemetery.

References

1963 deaths
St. George Dragons players
Australian rugby league players
Country New South Wales rugby league team players
Road incident deaths in New South Wales
1931 births
Rugby league five-eighths